Mont du Lac des Cygnes ("Swan Lake Mountain") is a mountain of the Jacques-Cartier Massif (Laurentian Mountains chain), located within the Grands-Jardins National Park in Quebec, Canada.

Toponymy 
It was used for the first time on a map of the Parc des Laurentides in 1942. As for the name of the lake, it has an obscure origin, but it would have been known since at least 1850.

Geography 
The summit of Mont du Lac des Cygnes is located in the eastern part of the Grands-Jardins National Park, almost at the limit of Saint-Urbain. The drop between the summit (981 m) and the surface of Lac des Cygnes (320 m), located below, is 660 m. This mountain is delimited between the course of the Rivière du Gouffre Sud-Ouest which passes the valley on the north side, and Le Gros Bras which passes in the valley on the south side.

The summit of the mountain once featured a forest fire observation tower, erected as a metal structure resembling the electricity towers for the transmission of electricity.

Sometimes school groups organize hikes along the path of the Tower to reach the summit. In 2007, students from the music concentration at Jean-de-Brébeuf high school gave a concert at the top of Mont du Lac-des-Cygnes. This hike was organized as part of the International Journal of Music, on October 1st. Nearly 200 students from the instrumental music concentration took part in the ascent of the mountain.

Activities 
It offers a view of Lac des Cygnes, the "Astroblème de Charlevoix" (Charlevoix impact structure) and even the St. Lawrence River.

See also 
 Grands-Jardins National Park
 List of mountains in Canada

References

External links 

Charlevoix Regional County Municipality
Geography of Capitale-Nationale
Tourist attractions in Capitale-Nationale
Mountains of Quebec